Hasan Vezir (born 7 September 1962) is a Turkish footballer manager and former player.

Club career
Started his career at Çaykur Rizespor of his hometown, he joined Trabzonspor in 1983, where he played for four seasons before returning Rizespor, due to paternal pressure. Attracted the Big Three with his performances, joined Fenerbahçe on loan in 1988–89 season, scoring 19 goals, Vezir had a major contribution for Fenerbahçe's most scoring season, which is an unbroken record of Süper Lig, as of 2014.

Following his spells in Fenerbahçe and Galatasaray, respectively, he spent rest of his career as a journeyman, played for four teams in eight seasons until 1999.

Vezir is one of 42 footballers played in Kıtalararası Derbi both under Fenerbahçe and Galatasaray jersey. He represented Turkey at U-21 and senior levels between 1984 and 1989, earned 19 caps (15 at seniors), being a part of the squad at Euro 1998 and 1990 World Cup qualifying stages, however, he was never able to score for the team.

International career
Vezir earned four caps for Turkey U21 national team between 1984 and 1985. He competed at 1986 UEFA European Under-21 Championship qualifying stage, played three matches up against Finland, England and, Romania, with two draws and one defeat. He also took a part of a friendly game with Albania on 27 March 1985.

Career statistics

Honours
Trabzonspor
 1. Lig: 1983–84
 Turkish Cup: 1984; runner-up: 1985
 Chancellor Cup: 1985

Fenerbahçe
 1. Lig: 1988–89

Galatasaray
 Chancellor Cup: 1990
 Turkish Federation Cup: 1991

References

Further reading

External links
 Profile at TFF 

1962 births
Sportspeople from Rize
Turkish footballers
Turkey international footballers
Çaykur Rizespor footballers
Galatasaray S.K. footballers
Fenerbahçe S.K. footballers
Bakırköyspor footballers
Adanaspor footballers
Kardemir Karabükspor footballers
Kartalspor footballers
Turkish football managers
Association football forwards
Süper Lig players
Living people